"Saint Joe on the School Bus" is a song by American rock band Marcy Playground. It was released as the second single from their self-titled 1997 debut album. Although far from being as successful as the band's later smash hit "Sex and Candy," "Saint Joe on the School Bus" managed to hit number 8 on the US Modern Rock Charts and number 31 on the Mainstream Rock Tracks. In the album liner notes Wozniak, the band's front man states "this song is about being picked on". A video was made for the song in which a schoolyard bully "cries wolf" and is eventually devoured by one.

Track listing
"Saint Joe On The School Bus" - 3:20
"The Vampires Of New York (Real Version)" - 2:55
"The Shadows Of Seattle (Live In Amsterdam)" - 2:50

Chart positions

1997 songs
1997 singles
Marcy Playground songs
Songs about bullying
Capitol Records singles
Songs written by John Wozniak